Thomas Oelsner (born 19 June 1970) is a retired German Paralympic Nordic skier who won multiple gold medals throughout his career. He was the first person to fail a drugs test at the Winter Paralympic Games and was stripped of two gold medals. After he served his ban he returned to competitive skiing and participated in the 2006 and 2010 Games.

Biography
Oelsner was born on 19 June 1970 and is currently an advertising salesman. In 1991 he was injured in a motorcycle accident which left him with a paralysed left arm. He entered the 1994 Winter Paralympics in Lillehammer as a LW6 class competitor in the biathlon and cross country skiing. Oelsner's first games were a success, winning three golds, one solo silver, and one silver as part of the German relay team. Since then he has continued to use the same skis, even sleeping with them, as a matter of tradition. At the 1998 Games in Nagano he won two golds and one individual silver, and a silver with the German relay team.

Failed drugs test
At the 2002 Winter Paralympics in Salt Lake City Oelsner won gold in the 7.5 km biathlon and the 5 km classic cross country. However, he would go on to become the first athlete to be sent home from a Winter Paralympic Games for failing a drug test when he tested positive for the steroid methenolone. He was suspended prior to the 10 km cross country event and subsequently stripped of the two gold medals. Oelsner protested his innocence, claiming that there had been a laboratory error or an act of sabotage involved.

Return to competition
Oelsner completed a six-month national ban and returned for the 2006 Winter Paralympics in Torino. He achieved a bronze in the 5 km cross country skiing.

At the 2010 Winter Paralympics in Vancouver Oelsner was embroiled in another controversy when he claimed that the sight on the gun he was using for the Biathlon had been sabotaged, smeared in something he thought might have been chocolate. He soon retracted the accusation and accepted responsibility, stating that whatever happened would have occurred when the gun was in his care. Oelsner announced his retirement from competitive skiing at the end of the 2010 Games.

References

1970 births
Living people
German male biathletes
Biathletes at the 1994 Winter Paralympics
Biathletes at the 1998 Winter Paralympics
Cross-country skiers at the 1994 Winter Paralympics
Cross-country skiers at the 1998 Winter Paralympics
Cross-country skiers at the 2006 Winter Paralympics
Cross-country skiers at the 2002 Winter Paralympics
Biathletes at the 2002 Winter Paralympics
Biathletes at the 2010 Winter Paralympics
Paralympic bronze medalists for Germany
Paralympic silver medalists for Germany
Paralympic gold medalists for Germany
Competitors stripped of Paralympic medals
Medalists at the 1994 Winter Paralympics
Medalists at the 1998 Winter Paralympics
Medalists at the 2006 Winter Paralympics
German male cross-country skiers
Paralympic medalists in cross-country skiing
Paralympic cross-country skiers of Germany
Doping cases in paralympic sports